NOLA Doughnuts was a doughnut shop with three locations in the Portland metropolitan area, in the U.S. state of Oregon. The original shop opened in Lake Oswego in 2015, and a second opened in northwest Portland's Pearl District in 2018. A third location opened in Beaverton in 2022. All locations closed in January 2023.

Description 
The menu includes beignets, café au lait, fritters, king cake, la'ssants, milkshakes, pralines, and ice cream sandwiches. The Portland shop has New Orleans-style décor and plays jazz.

History 
The business was started by Rob Herkes, his sister Connie DeMerell, and third partner Frank Halpin. The trio sold products at the Beaverton Farmers Market before opening a brick and mortar store in Lake Oswego in October 2015. The business expanded in March 2018, with a second shop in northwest Portland's Pearl District.

In 2019, NOLA Doughnuts became part of the Underground Donut Tour.

A third location opened in Beaverton in 2022.

All three locations closed in January 2023. An announcement said, "The slow rebound from the pandemic and the current economic conditions have led us to make this difficult decision. We have enjoyed serving everyone our delicious New Orleans inspired treats over the years and we want to thank our amazing team members and our customers for being a part of this journey."

Reception 
Janelle Lassalle included NOLA Doughnuts in Eater Portland's 2017 list of "11 Restaurants That Define Lake Oswego". Alex Frane included the business in Thrillist's 2021 list of "The Absolute Best Donut Shops in Portland".

See also 

 List of doughnut shops
 List of defunct restaurants of the United States

References

External links

 
 NOLA Doughnuts (Lake Oswego) at Zomato

2015 establishments in Oregon
2023 disestablishments in Oregon
Defunct restaurants in Oregon
Defunct restaurants in Portland, Oregon
Doughnut shops in the United States
Pearl District, Portland, Oregon
Restaurants disestablished during the COVID-19 pandemic
Restaurants disestablished in 2023
Restaurants established in 2015
Restaurants in Beaverton, Oregon
Restaurants in Lake Oswego, Oregon